Kasturi is an Indian soap opera  that aired on STAR Plus channel from 23 April 2007 through 31 March 2009. The soap opera was created by Ekta Kapoor and was produced by her production company Balaji Telefilms.

Plot

Kasturi revolves around Kasturi Chawla, a young woman from a middle-class family. After graduating from university, she begins working for Robbie Sabharwal - a spoilt, arrogant, yet immensely popular rockstar.

Robbie and Kasturi take an instant disliking to each other due to the difference in their class, values and morals. Kasturi befriends Robbie's best friend Raunak (Jatin Shah), who seems to respect and understand her beliefs. As Robbie and Kasturi spend more time together, they start to fall in love and eventually confess their feelings. Their relationship is short-lived, as a misunderstanding causes Robbie to believe that Kasturi is cheating on him with Raunak.

After Robbie and Kasturi split up, Raunak proposes to Kasturi and she accepts after brief hesitation. On the day of their wedding, Robbie learns that he had misunderstood Kasturi and Raunak's relationship. He apologizes and begs Kasturi to reconcile with him, but she denies on the basis that their relationship has no future due to his constant lack of trust in her.

Raunak and Kasturi's wedding is followed by a series of events where Robbie tries to sabotage their relationship, but his attempts backfire and bring Raunak and Kasturi even closer. Soon, Raunak dies in an accident and Kasturi starts to believe that Robbie killed him. She sets out to take revenge by marrying him, under the pretext of moving on, and then makes life a living hell for him. Her plan seems to succeed and Robbie ends up in coma. However, Kasturi is shell-shocked when,  in Malaysia, she comes face to face with Raunak, who is very much alive.

Raunak smugly tells Kasturi how he has been toying with her all along and how he has been the sole cause of her misery. He explains that he had always secretly resented Robbie because he (Robbie) gained fame and popularity while Raunak had not. So when he realized that Robbie/Kasturi broke up, he decided to get even by deliberately marrying Kasturi to hurt Robbie. Then he faked his own death to frame Robbie for murder. The person who helped him engineer this plot turns out to be Robbie's sister Shivani. She and Raunak have been in love since childhood, and she loathes Robbie with equal passion. The two of them tell an appalled Kasturi that their next move is to kill Robbie to get their hands on his wealth.

Kasturi returns to India, but finds out that Robbie (who has now recovered) detests her for making him suffer for a crime he didn't commit. Eventually, one incident leads to another and Robbie/Kasturi reunite - only to have Raunak re-enter their lives and torture Kasturi on a daily basis, as she's the only one who's aware of his true intentions. A lot of twists and turns follow - Maasi (Robbie's maternal aunt) enters the picture and is revealed to be in cahoots with Raunak. Kasturi is shot, falls off a cliff and loses her mental balance.

Robbie lets her stay in his house, but she behaves like a child and can't remember anything about her past. Shortly after that, Raunak's true colours are exposed to everyone and he's sent to prison. However, everyone is still unaware of the fact that Maasi was in cahoots with him. Another accident returns Kasturi to her normal state. Once again, she and Robbie reunite.

During the preparations for Robbie and Kasturi's wedding, a middle-aged businessman named Kabir Dhanrajgir is introduced to the story. Kasturi finds out that a significant portion of Robbie's property has been sold, and that Kabir acted as a catalyst to it. When she begs him to fix the situation, he blackmails her by saying that she would have to marry him for that. On the day of her wedding, she leaves Robbie and marries Kabir.

Robbie resorts to drinking and sleeping around to keep his mind off Kasturi. On the other hand, spending time with Kabir makes Kasturi realize that he is a kind-hearted man but doesn't share a good rapport with his two grown up children, who term him as a failed parent.

But after that Robbie gets to know that Kabir is not a good person and has killed his three wives. Knowing this Robbie tries to get Kasturi out of this mess by telling about Kabir; but Kabir blackmails Robbie that he will kill Kasturi's parents. Kabir dies by falling from a cliff. Kasturi learns the truth after his death.

Robbie again wants to marry Kasturi but his mom Devika scolds Kasturi for spoiling his life. So Kasturi leaves the house without telling anybody and goes to live with her friend Sanchi. Robbie goes to meet Kasturi and finds out that she went away. He goes back to his mom and tells her that he hates her for separating them. Kasturi starts working in the office of Gayatri Devi. There she meets 3 brothers—Abhi, Ajay and Adwit—and solves their problems. Robbie is very sad thinking about Kasturi, when his daddy comes and tell him to start singing again for him. Kasturi's employers want to organize an event and they want Robbbie to start the event. Kasturi is there, too. When Abhi calls Robbie he says that he has stopped singing. Kasturi is thinking about Robbie and Robbie is thinking about Kasturi. At the end, when Kasturi is about to be married to one of the three brothers, he finds about her and Robbie. Then Robbie and Kasturi marry and all is well.

Cast

Reception
Initially, it was garnering 4 TVR while in September 2007 it decreased to 2.97 TVR.

References

External links
 Official website

Balaji Telefilms television series
2007 Indian television series debuts
2009 Indian television series endings
StarPlus original programming
Indian television soap operas